Mehdi Fononi Zadegan (born 1962 in Tehran, Iran) is a retired Iranian football player.

Club career

National team

Honours
 Gold Medal winner at 1990 Asian Games, as member of the Iran national football team.
Nominated for 1993 Asian Footballer of the Year winning 13 votes losing to Fahad Al-Bishi who received 17 and Kazuyoshi Miura who won the award with 30 votes.
Winner of ECO Cup 1993, as member of the Iran national football team.
 1993 Asian Footballer of the Year 3rd place

References

1962 births
Living people
People from Tehran
Iranian footballers
Esteghlal F.C. players
Pas players
Saipa F.C. players
bahman players
Iran international footballers
1988 AFC Asian Cup players
1992 AFC Asian Cup players
Asian Games gold medalists for Iran
Asian Games medalists in football
Footballers at the 1990 Asian Games
Association football midfielders
Medalists at the 1990 Asian Games
20th-century Iranian people